Ho Pei-shan is a Taiwanese politician. She currently serves as the Deputy Secretary-General of the Executive Yuan since 2 August 2016.

Early life
Ho obtained her bachelor's degree in mass communication from Fu Jen Catholic University.

Political careers
Ho was the deputy director of Policy Research and Coordinating Committee of the Democratic Progressive Party in 2010–2016.

Executive Yuan
Ho was sworn into the position of the Deputy Secretary-General of the Executive Yuan on 2 August 2016 at the Presidential Office Building.

References

Living people
Fu Jen Catholic University alumni
Political office-holders in the Republic of China on Taiwan
21st-century Taiwanese women politicians
21st-century Taiwanese politicians
Year of birth missing (living people)